The 2021 U23 World Wrestling Championships was the fourth edition of the U23 World Wrestling Championships of combined events and it was held from 1 to 7 November 2021 in Belgrade, Serbia.

Medal table

Team ranking

Medal summary

Men's freestyle

Men's Greco-Roman

Women's freestyle

References

World Wrestling U23 Championships
International wrestling competitions hosted by Serbia
International sports competitions in Belgrade
World U23 Wrestling Championship
World U23 Wrestling Championships